Supermercados Internacionales HEB, S.A. de C.V. is the Mexican division of H-E-B, a private supermarket chain based in San Antonio, Texas, U.S. It competes mainly with Soriana, Walmart México, S-Mart, Chedraui and Casa Ley.

In 1997, H-E-B opened the first store in Monterrey. By the end of 1999, the company was operating six stores in Mexico—five in Monterrey and one in Saltillo, one of the stores operated under the name EconoMax, and was similar to the H-E-B Pantry stores H-E-B caters to local by offering mostly Mexican-made products.

Current stores 
Nuevo León (30): Zuazua, Cabezada, Puerta De Hierro, La Puerta, Metroplex, Las Puentes, Chipinque, Contry, TEC, San Nicolás, Hacienda Los Morales, Aztlán, Chapultepec, Lincoln, Gonzalitos, Linda Vista, Santa Catarina, Solidaridad, San Roque, Guadalupe Juárez, Escobedo, San Pedro, Acapulco, Guadalupe Livas, Cumbres, Sendero, La Concordia, Valle Alto, El Uro, Ciudadela, Huinalá and Valle Oriente.
Tamaulipas (12): Victoria, Lauro Villar, Tampico Madero, Reynosa Morelos, Matamoros, Tampico, Nuevo Laredo, Reynosa Periférico, Rio Bravo, Tampico Hidalgo, Reynosa Las Fuentes and Reynosa Aeropuerto.
Coahuila (7): Saltillo República, Saltillo La Nogalera, Saltillo San Patricio, Torreón Independencia, Torreón Revolución, Torreón Senderos, Piedras Negras and Monclova.
San Luis Potosí (4): San Luis Potosí Himno Nacional, San Luis Potosí 57, San Luis Potosí carretera a Río Verde, HEB Lomas
Guanajuato (4): León, Irapuato
Aguascalientes: Aguascalientes Norte, Aguascalientes Santa Monica
Querétaro (3): Juriquilla, El Refugio, El Mirador

Future cities 

Gomez Palacio, Durango 
 Ciudad Acuna, Coahuila.

See also 
Soriana
H-E-B, parent company.
Walmex
Comercial Mexicana (Defunct in 2018)

Notes

Supermarkets of Mexico
Retail companies established in 1997
Mexican subsidiaries of foreign companies